Buena is an unincorporated community in Yakima County, with a 2010 census population of 990. The community was not recognized in the 2000 census figures. Washington, United States. Buena has a post office with ZIP code 98921. Its name originates from Spanish  "good".

References 

Unincorporated communities in Yakima County, Washington
Unincorporated communities in Washington (state)